"Teardrops" is a song by British R&B group the 411. It was written by band members Suzie Furlonger, Carolyn Owlett, Tisha Martin and Tanya Boniface along with Fitzgerald Scott and Kim Hoglund for their debut studio album Between the Sheets (2004), while production was helmed by Scott and Hoglund. The song is built around a sample of "Sour Times" (1994) by English trip hop group Portishead, itself a sample of Argentine composer Lalo Schifrin's "Danube Incident" (1967). Due to the inclusion of the sample, Schifrin is also credited as a songwriter. "Teardrops" was released as the album's third and final single from and debuted and peaked on the UK Singles Chart at number 23.

Track listings

Notes
  denotes additional producer

Personnel and credits 
Credits adapted from the liner notes of Between the Sheets.

Naweed Ahmed – mastering engineer
Tanya Boniface – vocals, writer
Steve Fitzmaurice – mixing engineer
Suzie Furlonger – vocals, writer
Kim Hoglund – producer, writer
Carolyn Owlett – vocals, writer

Tisha Martin – vocals, writer
Lalo Schifrin – writer (sample)
Fitzgerald Scott – producer, writer
Steve Sedgwick – engineering assistance
Jonathan Shakhovskoy – Pro Tools

Charts

Release history

References 

2004 singles
The 411 songs
2004 songs
Compositions by Lalo Schifrin